The National Audubon Society (Audubon) is an American non-profit environmental organization dedicated to conservation of birds and their habitats. Located in the United States and incorporated in 1905, Audubon is one of the oldest of such organizations in the world.  There are completely independent Audubon Societies in the United States, which were founded several years earlier such as the Massachusetts Audubon Society and Connecticut Audubon Society.

The society has nearly 500 local chapters, each of which is an independent 501(c)(3) non-profit organization voluntarily affiliated with the National Audubon Society. They often organize birdwatching field trips and conservation-related activities.  It also coordinates the Christmas Bird Count held each December in the U.S., a model of citizen science, in partnership with Cornell Lab of Ornithology, and the Great Backyard Bird Count each February.  Together with Cornell, Audubon created eBird, an online database for bird observation.  The National Audubon Society also has many global partners to help birds that migrate beyond the U.S.'s borders, including BirdLife International based in Great Britain, Bird Studies Canada, American Bird Conservancy, and many partners in Latin America and in the Caribbean. Audubon's International Alliances Program (IAP) brings together people throughout the Western Hemisphere to work together to implement conservation solutions at Important Birds Areas (IBAs).

History

Development of Audubon societies
In 1886, Forest and Stream editor George Bird Grinnell was appalled by the negligent mass slaughter of birds that he saw taking place. As a boy, Grinnell had avidly read Ornithological Biography, a work by the bird painter John James Audubon; he also attended a school for boys conducted by Lucy Audubon. The Audubon name became the namesake of the society he founded.

Within a year of its foundation, the early Audubon Society claimed 39,000 members. Eventually, it attained a membership of 48,862. Each member signed a pledge to "not molest birds." Prominent members included jurist Oliver Wendell Holmes, Jr., abolitionist minister Henry Ward Beecher, and poet John Greenleaf Whittier. This society was later discontinued, but the name and plan survived.

Organizations for the protection of birds were not a wholly new idea. Even before Grinnell's Audubon Society was organized, the American Ornithologists' Union, founded in 1883, was aware of the dangers facing many birds in the United States. There were, however, influential ornithologists who defended the collection of birds. In 1902, Charles B. Cory, the president-elect of the AOU refused to attend a meeting of the District of Columbia Audubon Society stating that "I do not protect birds. I kill them."

In 1895, the first Audubon Society was created.  Cousins and Boston socialites, Harriet Hemenway and Minna B. Hall, disturbed by the destruction left by plume hunters, organized a series of afternoon teas with other wealthy local women, encouraging them to avoid feathered garments.  They also sent literature asking these women to, in Hall's words, "join a society for the protection of birds, especially the egret." Later that same year, they founded the Massachusetts Audubon Society. Over 900 women came together with Hemenway and Hall, and across the country, many others were doing the same. These boycotts were largely successful, and the efforts of the early society members helped bring about the end of the plume trade and assisted in the introduction of early conservation legislation such as the Migratory Bird Treaty Act. In 1896, Pennsylvania created their Audubon Society, and during the next few years, bird lovers in many other states followed suit. St. Louis Audubon Society (SLAS) was established in 1916 as the St Louis Bird Club. In 1944, the Bird Club became the first local Audubon chapter in the United States. The national committee of Audubon societies was organized at a meeting held in Washington, D.C. in 1902. 1905 saw the organization of the National Association of Audubon Societies for the Protection of Wild Birds and Animals; William Dutcher was president, and T. Gilbert Pearson was secretary and financial agent. During this time, Albert Willcox provided financial support, more than $331,072 in 1905 and 1906. At the end of 1906, the Association had an interest-bearing endowment fund of more than $336,000 and an income from other sources of approximately $9,000.

Bird protection

Birds in the United States were threatened by market hunting as well as for the fashion industry. Pressure from shooting enthusiasts was intense. For example, great auks, whose habit of crowding together on rocks and beaches made them especially easy to hunt, had been driven to extinction early in the century. During one week in the spring of 1897, nature author Florence Merriam claimed to have seen 2,600 robins for sale in one market stall in Washington alone. By the start of the 20th century, the sale of bird flesh had never been greater. The second equally great threat to the bird population was the desire for their plumage. In the late 1890s, the American Ornithologists' Union estimated that five million birds were killed annually for the fashion market. In the final quarter of the 19th century, plumes, and even whole birds, decorated the hair, hats, and dresses of women. Poachers killed game warden Guy Bradley on July 8, 1905; poachers killed Game Warden Columbus G. McLeod in November 1908 in Florida and Audubon Society employee Pressly Reeves of South Carolina also in 1908.

Public opinion soon turned on the fashion industry. Bolstered by the support of Boston socialite Harriet Hemenway, President Theodore Roosevelt, an avowed Audubon Society sympathizer, and a widespread letter-writing campaign driven by church associations, many of whom distributed the Audubon message in their various newsletters, the plume trade was halted by such laws as the New York State Audubon Plumage Law (May 1910), which banned the sales of plumes of all native birds in the state. By 1920, similar laws were enacted in about 12 other states. Audubon Society activities are responsible for many laws for the establishment of game commissions and game warden forces, or prohibiting the sale of game.

Refuges

In 1918, the NAS actively lobbied for the Federal Migratory Bird Treaty Act. In the 1920s, the organization also played a vital role in convincing the U.S. government to protect vital wildlife areas by including them in a National Wildlife Refuge system.

The association also acquired land through purchases and donation. The Theodore Roosevelt Sanctuary and Audubon Center in Oyster Bay, New York was donated to New York Audubon in 1923 by Emlen Roosevelt and Christine Roosevelt in memory of their cousin, who is buried in the adjacent Youngs Memorial Cemetery. The Audubon Center of Greenwich, Connecticut was founded in 1943. The Paul J. Rainey Wildlife Sanctuary in Louisiana was acquired in 1924, and at  it is still the largest.

In the late 20th century, the organization began to place a new emphasis on the development of Centers in urban locations, including Brooklyn, New York; East Los Angeles, California; Phoenix, Arizona; and Seattle, Washington.

Field guides
In 1934, with membership at a low of 3,500, and with the nation in the Great Depression, John H. Baker became the NAS president. He was a World War I aviator and ardent bird lover, and also a businessman, and he set about to invigorate the society and bolster its budget prosperity through publication. Baker began publishing book-length field guides on major forms of bird and mammal life. Soon, in association with New York publisher Alfred A. Knopf, the Audubon Field Guides became a staple of every artist's and environmentalist's library. Today, many Audubon field guides have been adapted for mobile phone apps. This field guide series covers a wide range of nature-related topics, including the night sky, rocks and minerals, wildflowers, and many animals. This series has sold 18 million copies and uses photographs instead of the commissioned paintings or other drawings that many other field guides possess, such as the Peterson Field Guides.

DDT, whaling, and politics
During the post-World War II period, the NAS was consumed by the battle over the pesticide DDT. As early as 1960, the society circulated draft legislation to establish pesticide control agencies at the state level. In 1962 the publication of Silent Spring by long-time Audubon member Rachel Carson gave the campaign against "persistent pesticides" a huge national forum. Following her death in 1964, the NAS established a fund devoted strictly to the various legal fights in the war against DDT.

Today, Audubon selects outstanding women in conservation to receive its prestigious Rachel Carson Award. Honorees include Bette Midler, founder of the New York Restoration Project; Dr. Sylvia Earle, oceanographer and founder of Deep Search International; Majora Carter, Founder and Executive Director of Sustainable South Bronx; actress and conservation activist Sigourney Weaver, and NRDC President Frances Beinecke.

Through the 1960s and 1970s, the society began to use its influence to focus attention on a wider range of environmental issues and became involved in developing major new environmental protection policies and laws. Audubon staff and members helped legislators pass the Clean Air, Clean Water, Wild and Scenic Rivers, and Endangered Species acts. In 1969, the society opened an office in Washington, D.C., in an effort to keep legislators informed of Audubon's priorities.

By the 1970s, NAS had also extended to global interests. One area that NAS became actively involved with was whaling. Between 1973 and 1974 alone, the poorly regulated whaling industry had succeeded in harvesting 30,000 whales. But by 1985, following the 37th annual meeting of the International Whaling Commission in Bournemouth, England, which was attended by officials from the National Audubon Society and other U.S.-based environmental organizations, a worldwide moratorium on whaling was declared. So successful has this moratorium been in restoring populations of many whales, that "non-consumptive uses of whales" may once again be permitted in some areas.

Television specials
During the 1980s and 1990s, the National Audubon Society produced a notable series of nature documentary television specials, many of which were entitled The World of Audubon. These included specials on many animals other than birds (the traditional focus of this organization) and on natural areas such as the Great Lakes. This series included a special documenting the rescue efforts to save the black-footed ferret from extinction. Arthur Unger of the Christian Science Monitor reviewed this special very favorably and wrote that this special
was "further proof that the Audubon series deserves a place in television's splendid wildlife triumvirate alongside Nature and National Geographic Specials."

Audubon Medal

The Audubon Medal is given in recognition of outstanding achievement in the field of conservation and environmental protection. 52 people have received the honor in Audubon's 108-year history.

List of awardees
Source: Audubon Society

 2019 Johnny Morris & Family
 2018 Sir David Attenborough
 2017 Frances Beinecke
 2016 Paul Tudor Jones II
 2015 Jack and Laura Dangermond
 2013 Louis Bacon
 2010 Donal C. O'Brien Jr. 
 2008 Richard Louv 
 2005 The Rockefeller Family 
 2004 Harriet Bullitt 
 2002 Edward H. Harte 
 2001 Michael Dombeck 
 2000 Chandler Robbins 
 1999 William Conway
 1998 Julie Packard
 1997 Hazel Wolf 
 1996 James Parks Morton
 1995 Edward O. Wilson 
 1994 Jimmy Carter 
 1993 Chief Oren Lyons and Anita Roddick 
 1992 John H. Chafee 
 1991 Ted Turner 
 1990 Durward L. Allen
 1989 Robert Redford
 1988 Oscar and Marguerita Arias
 1987 Vladimir E. Flint
 1986 John F. Seiberling
 1985 Cecil D. Andrus
 1984 Joseph J. Hickey 
 1983 Margaret Wentworth Owings 
 1982 C.R. "Pink" Gutermuth
 1981 Richard H. Pough
 1980 Margaret E. Murie
 1979 Thomas L. Kimball
 1978 Charles H. Callison
 1977 Russell W. Peterson
 1976 John B. Oakes
 1975 Maurice F. Strong
 1974 Tom McCall
 1973 Barbara Ward (Lady Jackson, D.B.E.)
 1971 Roger Tory Peterson
 1969 Horace M. Albright
 1968 Henry Fairfield Osborn Jr.
 1967 Stewart Udall
 1966 A. Starker Leopold
 1964 Laurance Rockefeller
 1963 Rachel Carson
 1962 William O. Douglas
 1961 Clarence Cottam
 1960 J.N. "Ding" Darling
 1959 Olaus Murie 
 1956 Ludlow Griscom
 1955 Walt Disney
 1952 Louis Bromfield
 1950 John D. Rockefeller Jr.
 1949 Ira Noel Gabrielson
 1947 Hugh Hammond Bennett

Current activities

In 2011, Audubon created a new model for positioning energy transmission lines along the East Coast to help preserve bird and wildlife habitat. Audubon President David Yarnold has made environmentally friendly siting for renewable energy one of the organization's highest priorities.

Audubon played an important part in bird rescue and Gulf Coast wetlands recovery efforts in the aftermath of the April 20, 2010, BP oil spill in the Gulf of Mexico, the largest accidental marine oil spill in the history of the petroleum industry. Audubon recruited over 34,000 volunteers to assist in rescuing, cleaning and releasing injured brown pelicans and other water birds. In addition, Audubon was a leader in pushing for legislation to use BP oil spill penalties to rebuild the Gulf Coast.

Audubon's Mississippi River and Louisiana Coastal Initiatives have been helping to restore coastal wetlands and to rebuild Mississippi River delta marshlands. The Mississippi Delta loses an area the size of Manhattan to the sea every year, stripping away coastal protections for both human communities and wildlife habitat.

Audubon's Important Bird Area program has been protecting 370 million acres along migratory bird flyways in the United States and is a key part of Audubon's work with BirdLife International and other conservationists around the globe. Audubon is leading the campaign for U.S. Congressional Reauthorization of the Neotropical Migratory Bird Conservation Act which would generate as much as $100 million each year to advance hemispheric bird conservation.

In Wyoming and across the Intermountain west, Audubon's Sagebrush Initiative works with industry, government, ranchers and conservationists to protect 15 million acres of greater sage grouse Core habitat. It also helps promote the development of renewable energy projects in the area.

Audubon also helped to secure the preservation of 240,000 acres of wild lands at the Tejon Ranch, the largest land conservation area created in California history.

In March 2020, the Arkansas chapter of the Audubon Society announced its plan to spend $80,000 to install solar panels on its grounds, which will make their Little Rock office the state's first nonprofit to utilize 100% solar energy.

Sanctuaries and nature centers
Nature centers and wildlife sanctuaries continue to be an important part of Audubon's work to educate and inspire the public about the environment and how to conserve it. Some of the Audubon's earliest nature centers are still teaching young and old alike about the natural world. In August 2011, Audubon's Hog Island Camp in Maine marked its 75th anniversary. Audubon's national network currently includes nearly 500 local chapters, 23 state programs, 41 nature centers. After nearly three-quarters of a century, the National Wildlife Refuge Campaign also remains a key component of overall NAS policy.

Conservation ranching initiative
Audubon has begun to certify bird-friendly ranching facilities, such as the Blue Nest Beef enterprise  in order to provide consumers with a method of determining the environmental credentials of the businesses advertising that they are providing "bird-friendly", "grass-fed", and similar products, as options for beef that is raised sustainably and benefits wildlife habitat.

Native plants database
An online database is provided by Audubon that displays which native plants are important for birds in different areas that is searchable by USA zip code.

Invasive species
Audubon has recently expanded its outreach about the detrimental impact of invasive species like Norway maples, Tatarian honeysuckle and other ecological threats to human health and wildlife.

Drilling for natural gas
The Audubon society opposes drilling for gas on national reserves. Natural gas has been drilled for and produced at its Paul J. Rainey Wildlife Sanctuary. The society said it was legally compelled to allow gas and oil drilling at the sanctuary under the terms of the land's donation by its original owners. This explanation, however, has been challenged. The presence of oil and gas drilling on Audubon's sanctuaries has been used to illustrate the difference between private and public decision-making.

An August 26, 2009, letter included the Central New Mexico Audubon Society, Champaign County Audubon Society, Delaware Audubon Society, Elisha Mitchell Audubon Society, Huachuca Audubon Society, Kalmiopsis Audubon Society, San Bernardino Valley Audubon Society, Sequoia Audubon Society, and Audubon South Carolina.

Dan W. Lufkin Prize for Environmental Leadership
The Dan W. Lufkin Prize for Environmental Leadership is a new award that recognizes Dan W. Lufkin's lifetime commitment to the environment and honors individuals who have dedicated their lives to on-the-ground conservation. As part of this award, the recipient receives a $100,000 cash prize, made through an endowment established by Dan's family and friends, to help further his or her conservation efforts. This award will become a signature prize in the field of conservation innovation. George Archibald was the inaugural Dan W. Lufkin Prize recipient for his tireless efforts to protect all species of cranes and their habitats throughout the world. The Wall Street Journal featured Dan W. Lufkin as the Donor of the Day, for the creation of this new Audubon prize.

Women in Conservation Program
The Rachel Carson Award is part of a broader Audubon initiative called Women in Conservation Project.  Their mission statement is "To recognize outstanding women leaders in today's conservation movement; to support environmental opportunities for girls and young women; and to educate women on important issues related to conservation and the environment." Audubon New York created the Rachel Carson Field Internship in 2012, which is given to young women seeking experience in the fields of "habitat-stewardship and wildlife-management." There is also the Women in Conservation Fellowship. These internships are given to women who wish to learn about areas such as public relations, management, and event planning.

Climate change report
In September 2014, the Audubon Society released its Audubon Birds and Climate Change report which found that expected changes to North American climate will have a major, detrimental impact on birds in the United States. The scope of the report includes 588 species of birds and found that 314 of those species could lose up to half of their climatic range during the 21st-century.

Namesake controversy 
The society was named in honor of John James Audubon, a Franco-American ornithologist and naturalist who painted, cataloged, and described the birds of North America in his famous Birds of America book (1827–1838). Despite these accolades, John James Audubon's legacy has been tarnished by numerous accusations of plagiarism and scientific fraud, which his biographers (and Audubon's leadership) have routinely dismissed or minimized, even while admitting to his history of racism and slavery. John James Audubon was also a body snatcher who collected human skulls to assist the race supremacist work of Samuel G. Morton. In the wake of the protests following the murder of George Floyd, there have been public appeals to strip the name Audubon from the society and change the names of species that honor him. The Audubon Society has publicly supported the removal of Confederate monuments, including acknowledging that "it's not just an issue of physical monuments." The Seattle chapter of Audubon has initiated a process to change the name and will announce the new one in June 2023. An internal Board of Directors vote in 2023 resulted in a decision to retain the Audubon name, with the subsequent resignation of three of its 26 board members.

Leadership

David Yarnold became Audubon's 10th president in September 2010, expressing a commitment to build on the organization's strong conservation legacy and expand its commitment to improving the quality of life for both birds and people by aligning Audubon's conservation work along the migratory flyways that millions of birds travel each spring and fall. Following layoffs and complaints about diversity and inclusion programs, an Audubon union organizing drive went public in March 2021 with about 400 workers. Yarnold stepped down the next month following an internal audit into Audubon's workplace culture and toxic workplace complaints. Elizabeth Gray is serving as interim CEO.

Audubon magazine

The National Audubon Society publishes a bi-monthly magazine called Audubon, currently overseen by the organizations's vice president of content, Jennifer Bogo.

See also

 List of environmental awards
 NatureShare (2009)

References

Notes

Further reading
 Frank Graham, Jr., The Audubon Ark: A History of the National Audubon Society (New York: Alfred A. Knopf, 1990) 
 Carolyn Merchant. Spare the Birds! George Bird Grinnell and the First Audubon Society (Yale University Press, 2016). xiv, 327pp

External links

 
 Audubon Magazine website
 Great Backyard Bird Count website
 Smithsonian Institution, National Museum of American History: "The Feather Trade and the American Conservation Movement" — online exhibition.

 

Audubon Society
Audubon Society
Audubon Society
Audubon Society
Non-profit organizations based in New York City
Audubon Society
Nature centers in Arizona
Nature centers in California
Nature centers in New York (state)
Organizations established in 1905
1905 establishments in the United States
1905 in the environment
Environmental organizations based in New York City